Moira Walley-Beckett is a Canadian television actress, producer, and writer. She was a writer and producer for the AMC drama Breaking Bad and the creator of two television series, Flesh and Bone and Anne with an E (titled Anne during the first season).

For her work on Breaking Bad, she won three Primetime Emmy Awards, including Outstanding Writing for a Drama Series, three Writers Guild of America Awards, two Producers Guild of America Awards, a Golden Globe, and a Peabody.

Early life
Walley-Beckett was raised in Vancouver, British Columbia, Canada, and attended the Banff School of Fine Arts. In 1982, she joined the Arts Club Theatre Company.

Career

Walley-Beckett worked from the mid-1980s until the early-2000s as a television actress. She guest-starred on many series, including MacGyver, 21 Jump Street, Wiseguy, Chicago Hope, Diagnosis Murder and ER.

She began writing for television in 2007 as a staff writer for the short-lived NBC detective drama Raines, starring Jeff Goldblum. In 2008 she joined the writing staff for the legal drama Eli Stone and penned the episode "Heal the Pain".

She joined Breaking Bad as a story editor for the second season and wrote the episodes "Breakage" and "Over". The second season writing staff were nominated for the Writers Guild of America (WGA) Award for best drama series at the February 2010 ceremony for their work on the second season. She was promoted to co-producer for the third season in 2010 and wrote the episodes "Mas" and (with Sam Catlin) "Fly." She was promoted again to producer for the fourth season in 2011.

For the fifth season, Walley-Beckett wrote "Gliding Over All" and "Ozymandias"; the latter received universal praise from critics, and has since been called one of the greatest episodes of television ever broadcast.  On August 25, 2014 she won the Primetime Emmy Award for Outstanding Writing for a Drama Series for "Ozymandias", becoming the first solo woman to win the award in the Drama category since Ann Biderman won in 1994.

After Breaking Bad ended, Walley-Beckett, a former ballet dancer, created the ballet drama miniseries Flesh and Bone for Starz. The show premiered in November 2015.

In January 2016, it was announced that Walley-Beckett would create, write and executive produce a television series based on children's classic Anne of Green Gables for Canada's CBC. Netflix came aboard in August to distribute the show internationally. The series, Anne with an E (titled Anne during the first season) aired on CBC in Canada and was later made available for streaming on Netflix. The series premiered on March 19, 2017, on CBC and on May 12 internationally. It was renewed for a second season on August 3, 2017, and for a third season in August 2018. Shortly after the third season was released in Fall 2019, CBC and Netflix announced that the series was canceled.

She wrote the 2018 film The Grizzlies alongside Justified creator Graham Yost, directed by Miranda de Pencier.

Filmography
Production staff

Writer

References

External links

Actresses from Vancouver
21st-century American screenwriters
American television actresses
American television writers
Canadian emigrants to the United States
Living people
American women television writers
Place of birth missing (living people)
Year of birth missing (living people)
21st-century Canadian screenwriters
Canadian television writers
Writers from Vancouver
Primetime Emmy Award winners
Canadian television actresses
Canadian expatriate writers in the United States
Showrunners
Canadian women screenwriters
Canadian women television producers
21st-century American women
Canadian women television writers